The Bride Stripped Bare is the fifth solo studio album by English singer Bryan Ferry. It was released in 1978, shortly before Ferry reconvened his band Roxy Music which had been on hiatus for three years. It was recorded after his girlfriend Jerry Hall left him for Mick Jagger in 1977, and appears to contain references to their break-up. The album peaked at number 13 on the albums chart in the United Kingdom.

The album's title is taken from the Marcel Duchamp artwork The Bride Stripped Bare by Her Bachelors, Even. Ferry had been introduced to the work as an art school student by Richard Hamilton. A subtext of Duchamp's piece is masculine and feminine relationships.

Critical reception
Reviewing for AllMusic, critic Ned Raggett wrote of the album "When Jerry Hall, front-cover model on Roxy's Siren, left Ferry for Mick Jagger, his response was this interesting album, not a full success but by no means a washout." Critic Robert Christgau wrote of the album, "Maybe the smoke in Bryan's eyes has finally reached his heart; the apparent sincerity of some of the singing here makes those five-minute moments when he lingers ponderously over a key lyric easier to take." and he added that "The Los Angeles musicians don't hurt either – the conjunction of his style of stylization (feigned detachment) makes for interesting expressive tension."

Greil Marcus listed it as his number one record in The Pazz and Jop Critics Poll of 1978. Marcus commented about the album, and is quoted saying, "Already a certified commercial stiff after only a couple of months in the racks, this stunningly personal album—comparable in its way to Van Morrison’s Astral Weeks, Jesse Winchester, John Cale’s Vintage Violence or Bob Dylan’s Blood on the Tracks—continues to deepen the Don-Juan-in-Hell persona this English eccentric has explored throughout the decade. Backed by American session men (notably guitarist Waddy Wachtel), Ferry acts out The Revenge of Lust, a tale that leaves all parties free to indulge their cruelest, most self-pitying instincts, and then pay for them. From “Can’t Let Go,” an extraordinarily dramatic account of a lover in exile, to “Hold On I’m Coming,” the latest in Ferry’s string of unlikely and successful covers, the record is glamorous, bitter, effete and passionate. As always, Ferry sings in the voice of Dracula risen from the grave—risen to tell us how much he cares.

Dave Marsh gave the record three stars (out of five) and wrote "The Bride Stripped Bare balances Ferry's approaches much more effectively, allowing him to cover such romantic soul standards as "That's How Strong My Love Is" alongside his despondently modern "When She Walks in the Room." The result might have been a triumph if it weren't for the misconceived production, largely the product of this quintessentially British singer working with such Los Angeles session musicians as Rick Marotta and Waddy Wachtel, who also coproduced. (Ferry's lack of commercial success in America was probably the reason for the inappropriate matchup.) Still, Bride suggests that Ferry's solo work still has much-underdeveloped potential; it's unfortunate that he has devoted all his time since then to the re-formed version of Roxy Music."

Mark Coleman in his three and half star review stated "The Bride Stripped Bare is more adventurous; many listeners thought it was foolhardy. Bryan Ferry recording in L.A. with session veterans? Well, guitarist Waddy Wachtel pulls out some surprisingly ripe riffs, while Ferry croons both Al Green's "Take Me to the River" and the Velvet Underground's "What Goes On" without showing signs of strains. Recent Roxy Music converts might begin their Ferry appreciation course with this undervalued and very accessible item."

Rob Sheffield in another three and half star review wrote "The Bride Stripped Bare was a real puzzle, slicking over some potentially great songs with a hack L.A. studio band (Waddy Wachtel on a Bryan Ferry record?). There's the glorious seven-minute "When She Walks in the Room" and a great version of the Irish folk song "Carrickfergus," but Ferry's "Take Me to the River" has about one-eighth of the Big Muddy juice of Al Green's original, and it had the misfortune to come out the same year as Talking Heads' version."

Track listing

Personnel
Musicians
 Bryan Ferry – vocals, backing vocals (5, 7), acoustic piano (5), arrangements (8), keyboards (10)
 Ann Odell – electric piano (1), acoustic piano (2, 3), string arrangements (2, 5, 10), organ (7)
 Steve Nye – electric piano (4, 9)
 Neil Hubbard – guitar (1-7, 9, 10)
 Waddy Wachtel – guitar (1, 2, 4, 6, 7, 8, 10), slide guitar (3), backing vocals (3, 5, 7)
 Alan Spenner – bass (1-4, 6, 7, 9)
 Herbie Flowers – string bass (5, 8)
 John Wetton – bass (10)
 Rick Marotta – drums (1-7, 9)
 Preston Heyman – drums (10)
 Mel Collins – saxophones (3, 9)
 Martin Drover – trumpet (3, 9)

Production and artwork
 Bryan Ferry – producer 
 Rick Marotta – producer 
 Steve Nye – producer, engineer 
 Simon Puxley – producer 
 Waddy Wachtel – producer 
 Jimmy Douglass – engineer 
 Lew Hahn – engineer 
 Dave Richards – assistant engineer
 Randy Mason – assistant engineer
 Martin Pearson – assistant engineer
 Cream – artwork 
 Antony Price – design
 John Swannell – photography
 Brian Harris – typography 
 Ahmet Ertegun – "counsel"
 Barbara Allen – cover star
 Anthony Clavet – make-up 
 Yvonne Gold – make-up

Charts

References

External links

1978 albums
Bryan Ferry albums
Albums produced by Steve Nye
Albums produced by Waddy Wachtel
E.G. Records albums